American singer and songwriter Erykah Badu has released five studio albums, one live album, one compilation album, one mixtape, 31 singles (including 13 as a featured artist), three promotional singles and 20 music videos. Badu's career began after opening a show for D'Angelo in 1994 in her hometown; record label executive Kedar Massenburg was highly impressed with her performance and signed her to Kedar Records. Her debut album, Baduizm, was released on February 11, 1997. It spawned three singles: "On & On", "Next Lifetime", and "Otherside of the Game". The album was certified triple platinum by the Recording Industry Association of America (RIAA).
Badu's first live album, Live, was released on November 18, 1997 and was certified double Platinum by the RIAA.

Badu's second studio album, Mama's Gun, was released on October 31, 2000. It spawned three singles: "Bag Lady", "Didn't Cha Know?", and "Cleva". The album was certified platinum by the RIAA. Badu's third album, Worldwide Underground, was released on September 16, 2003. It generated two singles: "Danger" and "Back in the Day (Puff)". The album was certified gold by the RIAA. Badu's fourth studio album, New Amerykah Part One (4th World War), was released on February 26, 2008. It spawned two singles: "Honey" and "Soldier". New Amerykah Part Two (Return of the Ankh) was released in 2010 and fared well both critically and commercially.

Albums

Studio albums

Live albums

Compilation albums

Mixtapes

Singles

As lead artist

As featured artist

Promotional singles

Other charted songs

Guest appearances

Other credits

Music videos

As lead artist

As featured artist

Notes

References

External links
 
 
 
 

Discographies of American artists
Contemporary R&B discographies
Soul music discographies
Jazz discographies
Hip hop discographies
Discography